Prairie Heights is a census-designated place (CDP) located in Pierce County, Washington.

Demographics
In 2010, it had a population of 4,405 inhabitants. 2,286  are male. 2,119 are female.

Geography
Prairie Heights is located at coordinates 47°8'58"N 122°6'19"W.

References

Census-designated places in Pierce County, Washington